Rikan or Reykan may refer to:
 Reykan, Fars
 Rikan, Sepidan, Fars Province
 Rikan, Hamadan
 Rikan, Semnan
 Rikan, West Azerbaijan